The Black Rocks at Pungo Andongo (Pedras Negras de Pungo Andongo) are a set of extensive monolithic rock formations, millions of years old, that stand out for their size in relation to the savanna landscape of the region. It is subdivided into Western, South, North and Southeast subsystems. The formation is an extension of the Cacuso Plateau.

The western rocky subsystem, the best known and most visited of all, is located in the municipality of Cacuso, in Malanje Province, and is an important tourist attraction in Angola.

According to tradition, the footprints carved into the rock belong to Ana de Sousa Ginga of Ndongo and Matamba, the great monarch of the kingdom of Ndongo.

The commune of Pungo-Andongo is located in the center of the western subsystem of the formation, where the ruins of the Fortress of Pungo-Andongo, built by the Portuguese in 1671, are also located.

References

Geography of Angola
Tourism in Angola